Dealing dogs may refer to:

The sale of animals to research labs
Dealing Dogs (film), a 2006 HBO documentary film about the sale of shelter dogs to research labs